The Shepherd: Border Patrol (also known simply as The Shepherd) is a 2008 American action film directed by Isaac Florentine. It stars Jean-Claude Van Damme, with a supporting cast of Natalie J. Robb, Stephen Lord, Gary McDonald, Scott Adkins and Van Damme's real life daughter Bianca Van Varenberg. The film was released on direct-to-DVD in the United States on March 4, 2008.

Plot
A former New Orleans cop Jack Robideaux (Jean-Claude Van Damme) arrives with his pet rabbit in Columbus, New Mexico to take a job with the border patrol, and working with Captain Ramona García (Natalie J. Robb).

At the moment, the border patrol is up against a highly dangerous drug smuggling operation, in which the smugglers are funneling illegal immigrants and bricks of heroin through the porous defenses of the Mexico US border. Migrants are randomly outfitted with C4 vests, so any border patrol agent who interferes might get blown up.

As it turns out, the smugglers are a rogue special forces unit led by Benjamin Meyers (Stephen Lord) and his right-hand man Karp (Scott Adkins), who have taken over all of the smuggling operations in the area by killing major drug kingpins Félix Néstor (Daniel Perrone) and Benito Ortiz (Luis Algar).

Jack and his partner Billy Pawnell (Gary McDonald) have their work cut out for them in trying to bring down Meyers and his operation. Myers and his henchmen take over and rig a missionary bus to smuggle drugs, but Jack and Billy pursue them across the border, out of their jurisdiction, where Jack is arrested by the local police, who are working for Meyers.

Once Jack is transferred from a Mexican jail to Meyers's compound, it turns out Billy is working for Meyers, who has also kidnapped Ramona and her uncle Emile (Dan Davies). Meyers kills Emile by throwing him into a pool of water charged by live wires.

It turns out that Jack has a personal reason for going after Meyers, as Meyers's drugs killed Jack's daughter, Kassie (Bianca Van Varenberg) about three months ago. Kassie was 16 years old. Jack's pet rabbit was originally Kassie's rabbit, and he carries it around in memory of Kassie. He also swore on her grave to take down whatever drug operation he could find.

Meanwhile, Jack and Ramona manage to free themselves and kill Billy. Ramona calls for help from Mexican police, and she and Jack start fighting their way through Meyers's men. Ramona goes to find an escape vehicle, but is knocked out in a car crash.

Next, Jack is confronted by Karp, who is a martial arts expert. They fight, and Karp brutally kicks Jack in the head, effectively slowing him down. Jack, however, manages to overpower Karp and beats him to death. Meyers, whose potential investors have abandoned him, confronts Jack and is about to shoot him when Jack throws an explosive collar toward Meyers and detonates it. In the ending scene, Ramona advises Jack to go back to New Orleans with his wife.

Cast

 Jean-Claude Van Damme as Detective Jack Robideaux
 Stephen Lord as Benjamin Meyers
 Natalie J. Robb as Capt. Ramona García
 Gary McDonald as Agent Billy Pawnell
 Daniel Perrone as Félix Néstor
 Scott Adkins as Karp
 Andrée Bernard as Lexxie
 Dan Davies as Emile
 Miles Anderson as Mayor Arthur Pennington
 Luis Algar as Benito Ortiz
 Todd Jenson as Wray
 Ivaylo Geraskov as Gallery
 Velislav Pavlov as The Contact
 Phil McKee as Jed
 Bogdan Plakov as Turgell
 Atanas Srebrev as Deshaun
 Dian Hristov as Stanton
 Bianca Van Varenberg as Kassie Robideaux
 Kaloian Vodenicharov as Jamul al Din

Production

Filming
The Shepherd: Border Patrol was filmed in Bulgaria for 47 days between 6 February and 25 March 2007.

Release

Home media
DVD was released in Region 1 in the United States on March 4, 2008, and also Region 2 in the United Kingdom on 7 July 2008, it was distributed by Sony Pictures Home Entertainment.

External links

2008 films
2008 action films
2000s police procedural films
American films about revenge
American action films
American police detective films
Films about drugs
Films directed by Isaac Florentine
Films set in New Mexico
Films shot in Bulgaria
Mexico–United States border
Stage 6 Films films
United States Border Patrol
2000s English-language films
2000s American films